Thiamine transporter 1, also known as thiamine carrier 1 (TC1) or solute carrier family 19 member 2 (SLC19A2) is a protein that in humans is encoded by the SLC19A2 gene. SLC19A2 is a thiamine transporter. Mutations in this gene cause thiamine-responsive megaloblastic anemia syndrome (TRMA), which is an autosomal recessive disorder characterized by diabetes mellitus, megaloblastic anemia and sensorineural deafness.

Structure 
The SLC19A2 gene is located on the q arm of chromosome 1 in position 24.2 and spans 22,062 base pairs. The gene produces a 55.4 kDa protein composed of 497 amino acids. In the encoded protein (TC1), a multi-pass membrane protein located in the cell membrane, the N-terminus and C-terminus face the cytosol. This gene has 6 exons while the protein has 12 putative transmembrane domains, with 3 phosphorylation sites in putative intracellular domains, 2 N-glycolysation sites in putative extracellular domains, and a 17-amino acid long G protein-coupled receptor signature sequence. The thiamine transporter protein encoded by SLC19A2 has a 40% shared amino acid identity with the folate transporter SLC19A1. The N-terminal domain and the sequence between the C-terminal domain and sixth transmembrane domain are required for proper localization of this protein to the cell membrane.

Function 
The encoded protein is a high-affinity transporter specific to the intake of thiamine. Thiamine transport is not inhibited by other organic cations nor affected by sodium ion concentration; it is stimulated by a proton gradient directed outward, with an optimal pH between 8.0 and 8.5. TC1 is transported to the cell membrane by intracellular vesicles via microtubules.

Clinical significance 
Mutations in the SLC19A2 gene can cause thiamine-responsive megaloblastic anemia syndrome (TRMA), which is an autosomal recessive disease characterized by megaloblastic anemia, diabetes mellitus, and sensorineural deafness. Onset is typically between infancy and adolescence, but all of the cardinal findings are often not present initially. The anemia, and sometimes the diabetes, improves with high doses of thiamine. Other more variable features include optic atrophy, congenital heart defects, short stature, and stroke.

A 3.8 kb transcript is expressed variably in most tissues, highest in skeletal and cardiac muscle, followed by medium expression placenta, heart, liver, kidney cells and low expression in lung cells. In melanocytic cells SLC19A2 gene expression may be regulated by MITF.

Interactions 
This protein interacts with CERS2.

References

Further reading

External links 
  GeneReviews/NIH/NCBI/UW entry on Thiamine-Responsive Megaloblastic Anemia or Rogers Syndrome
 

Solute carrier family